Donald Robertson, (born 7 March 1962) is an artist and a creative director for Esteé Lauder Companies.

Early life 
Robertson was born and raised in Toronto, Ontario, Canada. He moved to New York in the early 1990s and lived in Larchmont, then relocated to Santa Barbara in the neighborhood of Montecito. He moved to Texas in December 2020.

Career

Beginning 
In the 1980s, Robertson attended the Ontario College of Art and Design. He did not complete his education there as he was asked to leave due to his disregard of realism, drawing people "longer and skinnier than they were."

When MAC Cosmetics launched in 1984, Robertson assisted with creative direction. In 1991, Robertson moved to New York City and worked at Hearst Communications where he launched Marie Claire magazine in 1993. He then redesigned Cosmopolitan with editor Bonnie Fuller. Robertson then moved to Condé Nast where he worked with James Truman and S. I. Newhouse School of Public Communications on Glamour and Cargo. After Esteé Lauder Companies acquired MAC Cosmetics in 1998, Robertson continued to work with the brand, helping create the MAC Viva Glam line in 1994. 100% of the MAC Viva Glam line's profits benefit the MAC AIDS Fund.

In 2007, Robertson started as a creative director at Esteé Lauder Companies. He has also done projects for Smashbox, Bobbi Brown, and Bergdorf Goodman. In 2014, Robertson completed an artist-in-residency at Eric Firestone Gallery and in August 2016, Amber Rose and creative director Robertson launched Flirt Cosmetics, a direct-to-consumer cosmetics brand.

Collaborations 
In 2014, Robertson partnered with ASPCA, designing products whose profits benefit the foundation. In 2015, he returned to work with the company again on their Save the Bees campaign, creating T-shirts that raised money for the UK organization Buglife. In 2016, he collaborated with Bloomingdales, designing a sweater of which a portion of profits went to the Breast Cancer Research Foundation.

In 2014, Robertson partnered with J. Crew to create a line of graphic T-shirts. That same year, Robertson collaborated with fashion designer Giles Deacon of Giles Deacon Couture, creating a flamingo motif for the Giles Resort '15 collection. This was an addition to his work on the Giles S/S '14 collection of which he designed its signature lip motif. Robertson also collaborated at an art event at the French boutique Colette.

In 2015, Robertson collaborated with a New York-based retail shop STORY on its 26th installation. Aside from Robertson's art, products featuring his designs included those by Canada Goose, Warby Parker, S'well Bottle, and Smashbox Cosmetics, among others. In November of the following year, Robertson launched a capsule collection with Junk Food Clothing Co., which featured a range of women's long and short sleeved T-shirts, tank tops, and baseball shirts, as well as, men's T-shirts and children's T-shirts and onesies.

Author 
In August 2015, Robertson published and released his first children's book Mitford at the Fashion Zoo, which follows Mitford the giraffe on his adventures at COVER magazine in the New York City fashion industry, what Robertson dubs the zoo. The book's North American launch was held at Hot Renfrew in January 2017. Robertson wrote a second book called Mitford at the Hollywood Zoo, which documents Mitford's experience at the Academy Zoowards.

In September 2017, he published Donald: The Book with Assouline Publishing. The book features many pieces from his collections.

Awards 
Robertson posts pieces of his art which often depict satirical fashion scenes and events. In 2014, Robertson was recognized by the CFDA and was nominated for "Instagrammer of the Year."

References 

1962 births
Living people
Artists from Toronto
Creative directors
Writers from Toronto
OCAD University alumni
Condé Nast people
American children's writers
American children's book illustrators